San Martín de Valdeiglesias is a town of Comunidad de Madrid with a population is 8,190 people.

History 
The Castle of Coracera was built in the fifteenth century.

Geography 
San Martín is near to Cadalso de los Vidrios, Pelayos de la Presa, Villa del Prado, Aldea del Fresno, Navas del Rey y Colmenar del Arroyo, other towns of Comunidad de Madrid, and it is also near the village of Ávila: El Tiemblo, and Pantano de San Juan.

Culture 
In the summer San Martín the population increases due to an influx of non-residents escaping the winter to spend their holidays.

The most well-known entertainers in the town are a music and dance group called "Grupo de Jotas María de la Nueva".

Festivals in San Martín are held between 7–12 September in honour of the Virgin Mary.

References

Municipalities in the Community of Madrid